Bompreço (Walmart Brazil) is a chain of supermarkets and hypermarkets in Brazil. Its name means "good price" in Portuguese. , Bompreço is owned by Walmart.

Bompreço operates mainly in northeastern Brazil, in the Bahia and Pernambuco states of Brazil.

The operating company, Walmart Brasil, has its headquarters in Barueri, São Paulo State. Prior to the buyout by Walmart, Bompreço S.A. Supermercados do Nordeste, headquartered in Iputinga, Recife, Pernambuco, was owned by the Dutch retailer Ahold (now Ahold Delhaize).

Currently, Bompreço supermarkets are in the process of being converted into Walmart Supermercado stores and Hiper Bompreço stores are being converted into Walmart Supercenters.

See also

 List of supermarkets
 João Carlos Paes Mendonça

References

External links
 Bompreço, Wal-Mart Brasil Retail 
 Wal-Mart Brasil Corporate 
 Bompreço (Archive, 2001–2003)
 Bompreço  (Archive)

Walmart
Retail companies established in 1935
Supermarkets of Brazil
Hypermarkets